Siamak Farahani (born 2 March 1977 in Iran) is an Iranian football coach and retired player who currently manages Damash Gilan. He was previously assistant coach of team.

Honours
Damash Gilan
Hazfi Cup: Runner-up 2018–19

References

1977 births
Living people
Iranian footballers
Iranian football managers
Damash Gilan managers
Association football midfielders
People from Rasht
Sportspeople from Gilan province